Sonchus bornmuelleri, or Bornmueller's sow-thistle, is a plant endemic to the Canary Island of La Palma.

Description
Perennial with woody stock. Leaves in a basal rosette, pinnatifid with rounded lobes; margins subspinose. Scape up to 80 cm, with a few small bracts. Inflorescence a dense corymb of up to 20 heads. Heads densely tomentose.

Distribution in La Palma
Cliffs south of  Santa Cruz de La Palma, coastal rocks near San Andrés y Los Sauces, lots pedregale (between the lighthouse and piscinas fajanas), Riscos de Bajamar, Garafia, Montaña del Viento, Mazo, Fuencaliente, etc., up to 200 m, rare.

References

 David Bramwell and Zoë Bramwell. Wild Flowers of the Canary Islands. Editorial Rueda, Madrid, España. 2001.

External links
 Flora, Biodiversidad Virtual es un proyecto de la Asociación Fotografía y Biodiversidad, Sonchus bornmuelleri Pit. photo, captions in Spanish
 Flora Vascular de las Canarias, photo from Mirador de Garome. La Palma
 Uniprot
 Plantas de mi tierra Un blog sobre flora y vegetación de Canarias,  Sonchus bornmuelleri 

bornmuelleri
Endemic flora of the Canary Islands